Epicriptine or beta-dihydroergocryptine is a dopamine agonist of the ergoline class. It constitutes one third of the mixture known as dihydroergocryptine, the other two thirds consisting of alpha-dihydroergocryptine. The alpha differs from the beta form only in the position of a single methyl group, which is a consequence of the biosynthesis in which the proteinogenic amino acid isoleucine is replaced by leucine.

References 

Dopamine agonists
Oxazolopyrrolopyrazines
Lactams
Ergot alkaloids
Lysergamides
Isopropyl compounds